Statistics of Qatar Stars League for the 2000–01 season.

Overview
It was contested by 9 teams, and Al-Wakrah Sports Club won the championship.

League standings

References
Qatar - List of final tables (RSSSF)

Qatar
1